The 2011 FIM Superstock 1000 Cup was the thirteen season of the FIM Superstock 1000 Cup, the seventh held under this name. The championship, a support class to the Superbike World Championship at its European rounds, used 1000 cc motorcycles and was reserved for riders between 16 and 26 years of age. The season was contested over ten races, beginning at TT Circuit Assen on 17 April and ending at Algarve International Circuit on 16 October.

Race calendar and results

Championship standings

Riders' standings

Manufacturers' championship

Entry list

All entries used Pirelli tyres.

References

External links

FIM Superstock 1000 Cup seasons
Superstock 1000 Cup